Sandra Braz Bastos (born 1 March 1978) is an international football referee from Portugal. She is an official at the 2019 FIFA Women's World Cup in France.

References

Living people
1978 births
Portuguese football referees
FIFA Women's World Cup referees
Women association football referees